Asmarud (also Romanized as Asmarūd and Esmrūd) is a village in Khanandabil-e Gharbi Rural District, in the Central District of Khalkhal County, Ardabil Province, Iran. At the 2006 census, its population was 69, in 18 families.

References 

Tageo

Towns and villages in Khalkhal County